Wolpertswende is a town in the district of Ravensburg in Baden-Württemberg in Germany.

World heritage site
It is home to one or more prehistoric pile-dwelling (or stilt house) settlements that are part of the Prehistoric Pile dwellings around the Alps UNESCO World Heritage Site.

References

Ravensburg (district)